The Meliá Cohiba Hotel is a high-rise hotel opened in 1994, located in the Vedado district of Havana, Cuba, just off the Malecón and next to the historic Hotel Habana Riviera. The hotel has 401 rooms and 61 suites. The hotel's sharp angles and alternating walls of stone and glass make it one of the more modern buildings in Havana, along with its sister the Meliá Habana.  The Cohiba has a wide range of restaurants and shops, as the Habanos Cigar Store. The Habana Café has a nightly floor show and live music.

External links

Hotel buildings completed in 1994
Hotels in Havana
Hotels established in 1994
1994 establishments in Cuba
20th-century architecture in Cuba